Balzhausen is a municipality in the district of Günzburg in Bavaria in Germany.

References

Populated places in Günzburg (district)